Artyom Anatolyevich Bezrodny (10 February 1979 – 13 September 2016) was a Russian association footballer.

Career
In 1995, he moved from Ukraine to Russia and eventually accepted Russian citizenship. In Germany he played for Bayer 04 Leverkusen II.

International career
Bezrodny played one game for the Russia national football team in a Euro 2000 qualifier against Andorra on 8 September 1999.

References

External links
 Player profile 

1979 births
2016 deaths
Ukrainian emigrants to Russia
Naturalised citizens of Russia
Russian footballers
Russia under-21 international footballers
Russia international footballers
FC Spartak Moscow players
Russian Premier League players
Bayer 04 Leverkusen players
Sportspeople from Sumy
Russian expatriate footballers
Expatriate footballers in Germany
Expatriate footballers in Azerbaijan
Russian expatriate sportspeople in Azerbaijan
Russian expatriate sportspeople in Germany
FK MKT Araz players
Association football midfielders